Park Dong-Hyuk (born 18 April 1979) is a South Korean former football defender who last played for K League Classic club Ulsan Hyundai. His previous clubs were Jeonbuk Hyundai Motors, Gamba Osaka, Kashiwa Reysol and Dalian Shide. He was a part of South Korea, who appeared at the Summer Olympics in 2000.

On 16 December 2011, Park signed a contract with Chinese Super League club Dalian Shide.

Club statistics

Honors

Club
Jeonbuk Hyundai Motors
Korean FA Cup – 2003, 2005
Korean Super Cup – 2004

Ulsan Hyundai
A3 Champions Cup – 2006
Hauzen Cup – 2007
Korean Super Cup – 2006

Individual
K-League Best XI – 2008

References

External links

 National Team Player Record 
 
 

1979 births
Living people
Association football defenders
South Korean footballers
South Korean expatriate footballers
South Korea international footballers
Jeonbuk Hyundai Motors players
Ulsan Hyundai FC players
Gamba Osaka players
Kashiwa Reysol players
Dalian Shide F.C. players
Chinese Super League players
K League 1 players
J1 League players
J2 League players
Expatriate footballers in Japan
Expatriate footballers in China
Footballers at the 2000 Summer Olympics
Olympic footballers of South Korea
Footballers from Seoul
South Korean expatriate sportspeople in Japan
South Korean expatriate sportspeople in China
Korea University alumni
Asian Games medalists in football
Footballers at the 1998 Asian Games
Footballers at the 2002 Asian Games
Asian Games bronze medalists for South Korea
Medalists at the 2002 Asian Games
Chungnam Asan FC managers